Pucca (Jjajang Sonyeo Ppukka) is an animated comedy television series based on a series of shorts created by the South Korean company VOOZ Character System. The series revolves around Pucca, a young girl who is in love and obsessed with a ninja named Garu. The series has aired on Champ TV and MBC TV in Korea. The series has also aired on Toon Disney's Jetix block in the United States, and on the international Jetix channels throughout Europe and Latin America. In Canada, the show aired on Family Channel.

Pucca premiered in 2006, with a set of 26 episodes (78 segments). The second season of the show, consisting of 13 episodes (39 segments), began airing in 2008 after it was ordered to be created by Jetix Europe. In October 2018, a third season was announced by Planeta Junior, a company within Planeta Group. The third season aired in South Korea on 10 December 2018 on MBC TV, and 19 December 2018 on Tooniverse. It consists of 26 episodes (76 segments). The third season of Pucca, titled "Pucca: Love Recipe" in English, released on Netflix on 31 December 2019.

In total, not including the previous online aired episodes of the show, this brought the number of created segments to 191. The main theme song is also sung in Korean.

Summary 
The series centers around the adventures of an 11-year-old noodle delivery girl named Pucca, who typically does not speak. She works in a local restaurant called the Goh-Rong in her town called Sooga Village, owned by her three uncles where their main dish is Jajangmyeon noodles. Her love interest is a 13-year-old ninja named Garu, who also does not speak. Garu is a committed ninja in training that has a serious demeanor, valuing his own company and silence, often seeing moments in which Pucca chases Garu and tries to kiss him. Pucca has a best friend named Ching, an 11-year-old that practices Jian swordsmanship. Ching has a pet chicken named Won who always sits on her head, and is in love with a boy named Abyo, a 14-year-old who pays no attention to her and only has interests in Kung-Fu and impressing other girls.

In the third season, there is an overarching plot surrounding the rivalry between Goh-Rong and a new local restaurant titled Dong King Restaurant (which was originally titled to be BonaSera in the trailer). Ring Ring, a local 12-year-old fashion star, who appeared previously in the show and also grows a love interest to Garu, is also revealed to be the daughter of Dong King and works alongside him and his servants against Pucca and Dong King.

Episodes

Voice cast

Pucca (Vancouver, original) 
 Tabitha St. Germain as Pucca, Ring Ring
 Maryke Hendrikse as Pucca (uncredited)
 Brian Drummond as Garu
 John Stocker as Garu (uncredited), Santa Claus (laughing)
 Brian Dobson as Uncle Dumpling
 Michael Dobson as Ho
 Dale Wilson as Linguini, Policeman Bruce
 Lee Tockar as Abyo, Dada, Tobe
 Chantal Strand as Ching
 Kathleen Barr as Doga, Ssoso
 French Tickner as Santa Claus
 Richard Newman as Master Soo
 Dave "Squatch" Ward as Muji
 Michael Daingerfield as Chang

Love Recipe

Korean version 
 Jeonghwa Yang as Pucca
 Shin Yong-woo as Garu
 Beom-gi Hong as Abyo
 Park Si-yoon as Ching
 Kim Hyeon-ji as Ring Ring
 So Junghwan as Uncle Dumpling
 Lee Sang-ho as Ho
 Hong Seung-hyo as Linguini
 Park Sungtae as Tobe
 Hyeon Gyeong-Su as Fyah
 Kim Shin-woo as Chang
 Kang Seong-woo as Bruce
All Korean Actors as Additional Characters

English version 
 Jeonghwa Yang (via archival recordings) as Pucca
 Shin Yong-woo (via archival recordings) as Garu
 Doug Erholtz as Abyo
 Melissa Fahn as Ching
 Karen Strassman as Ring Ring
 Kirk Thornton as Uncle Dumpling, Bruce
 Spike Spencer as Ho, Casano, Santa Claus
 Steve Canden as Linguini, Fyah
 Ben Pronsky as Tobe, Ayo, Dandy
 Stephanie Sheh as Granny, Panky
 Todd Haberkorn as Chang, Dada
 Tony Azzolino as Ssoso
 Michael Sorich as Dong King, Jin, Siva

Home media

Awards 
At the 2006 Annecy International Animated Film Festival, the Pucca episode "A Force of Won" was "nominated for two awards, including the Prix Jeunesse in the Animation category." During the same year, Pucca won the Leo Awards for best screenwriting, along with "best overall in an animation program."

Music tour 
A musical show for the series was held in Lima on 8 October 2009. This location was chosen because of Pucca being "one of the most beloved programs on Jetix's Latin American channel". The show repeated itself eight times from 8 to 11 October 2009.

See also 

 Pucca – information about the Pucca franchise.
 Canimals – another children's television series created by Voozclub.

References

External links 
 

2000s Canadian animated television series
2000s South Korean animated television series
2006 Canadian television series debuts
2006 South Korean television series debuts
2008 Canadian television series endings
2008 South Korean television series endings
Animated television series about children
Anime-influenced Western animated television series
Canadian children's animated action television series
Canadian children's animated adventure television series
Canadian children's animated comedy television series
Canadian children's animated fantasy television series
Canadian flash animated television series
English-language television shows
Jetix original programming
Martial arts television series
NHK original programming
Ninja fiction
South Korean children's animated action television series
South Korean children's animated adventure television series
South Korean children's animated comedy television series
South Korean children's animated fantasy television series